The Smith Quartet is a UK based string quartet founded in 1988 that specializes in the performance of contemporary classical music, and is actively performing worldwide and recording . They have premiered over 100 works by composers such as Kevin Volans, Graham Fitkin, Michael Nyman, Karl Jenkins, and Sally Beamish. They have also collaborated with dance companies and musicians in other genres, notably jazz composer Django Bates and Britpop band Pulp. The quartet frequently uses amplification and live electronics in performance to expand their range of performing venues and repertoire.

Their performance of Steve Reich's Different Trains was featured in the film Holocaust.

Members

Current members
Ian Humphries (1st violin)
Rick Koster (2nd violin)
Nic Pendlebury (viola)
Deirdre Cooper (cello)

Former members
Steven Smith (violin)
Tanya Smith (cello)
Clive Hughes (violin)
Charles Mutter (violin)
Darragh Morgan (violin)
Sophie Harris (cello)
Philip Sheppard (cello)

References

External links
Official website

Musical groups established in 1988
English string quartets
Contemporary classical music ensembles